Sohier of Enghien (died March 21, 1364) was the titular Duke of Athens, and Count of Brienne and Lord of Enghien from 1356 to 1364.

The second, but eldest surviving son of Walter of Enghien (Gautier III d'Enghien) (fr) and Isabella of Brienne, when his mother divided the inheritance of his uncle Walter VI of Brienne among her sons, he received the title of Duke of Athens. He was executed by Albert, Duke of Bavaria in 1364, leaving the titular Duchy to his son 
 Walter IV of Enghien.

1364 deaths
Counts of Brienne
14th-century executions
Year of birth unknown
14th-century French people